Lutte, meaning 'struggle' or 'fight' in French, is also used to refer to the sport of wrestling.

Lutte or La Lutte may also refer to:

 La Lutte (newspaper), a French-language communist newspaper in 1930s Saigon
 Lutte Traditionnelle, a form of West African folk wrestling
 Wrestling (1961 film), a 1961 French documentary film, titled in French as La Lutte

See also 

 Lute (disambiguation)
 Lutes (surname)